Songs I Love to Sing may refer to:
 Songs I Love to Sing (Brook Benton album), 1960
 Songs I Love to Sing (Slim Whitman album), 1980